is an autobahn in Oldenburg in northwestern Germany. It connects the A 29 with the A 28.

Exit list

|}

External links 

293
A293